Henan University of Technology is the western terminus of Zhengzhou Metro Line 1. It was opened on 12 January 2017. The station lies beneath the crossing of Changchun Road and Lianhua Street.

Station layout  
The station has 2 floors underground. The B1 floor is for the station concourse and the B2 floor is for the platforms and tracks. The station has one island platform and two tracks for Line 1.

Trains usually use platform 1 for loading/unloading passengers.

Exits

Surroundings 
 Henan University of Technology
 Zhengzhou University

References 

Stations of Zhengzhou Metro
Line 1, Zhengzhou Metro
Railway stations in China at university and college campuses
Railway stations in China opened in 2017